Ray Shepardson (born Little Falls, New York; May 3, 1897 – November 8, 1975) was a baseball player who played catcher for the 1924 St. Louis Cardinals. He batted and threw right handed.

External links
 https://www.baseball-reference.com/s/shepara01.shtml

Baseball catchers
People from Little Falls, New York
1897 births
1975 deaths
St. Louis Cardinals players